Starr Restaurants, stylized as STARR Restaurants, is a restaurant group headed by founder and CEO Stephen Starr, with restaurants in Philadelphia, New York City, Washington D.C., South Florida, and Paris, France.

Overview
Starr Restaurants has been recognized as "one of the largest multiconcept operators in the country, with restaurants up and down the Eastern Seaboard, from New York to Miami" by the magazine Restaurant Hospitality. The restaurants have been noted as having an emphasis on "theatrical details, like music, lighting and backdrops." The magazine Travel + Leisure noted that "Starr [Restaurants] creates complete environments with an artistic, almost cerebral approach". The majority of Starr Restaurants are distinct concepts, but some restaurants are reproduced in different cities, such as Buddakan and El Vez.

History
In 1995, Stephen Starr founded Starr Restaurants, and the company opened its first restaurant, "Continental Restaurant & Martini Bar" in September of that year in Center City, Philadelphia. Mayor Ed Rendell said, "It was like a shock of electricity for the development of Old City and led the way for the restaurant revolution down there." In the following years, Starr opened several more restaurants in Philadelphia.

In 2006, Starr Restaurants expanded to New York and Atlantic City. By 2009, there were 18 restaurants in the Starr portfolio, including one in Florida. In 2013, Starr expanded to Washington, D.C., growing to 30 restaurants. In 2016, Starr opened their first restaurant outside the United States, Chez La Vieille in Paris.

Notable sales
Starr's catering operation, Starr Events, was sold to TrustHouse Services in August 2015 for $40 million.

Awards
The head of Starr Restaurants, Stephen Starr, has been named "Restaurateur of the Year" by both Bon Appétit and Zagat." Starr was named the Richard Melman Innovator of the Year by Restaurant Hospitality in 2013. In 2017, Starr won the James Beard Award for "Outstanding Restaurateur."

The Starr Restaurant Le Coucou with chef Daniel Rose was named 2017 "Best New Restaurant" by the James Beard Foundation. Le Coucou was also one of Food & Wine magazine's 2017 Restaurants of the Year. The Clocktower with Jason Atherton received the first star for the Starr Restaurant group in the 2018 Michelin Guide.

Restaurants 
As of 2019, there were twenty Starr Restaurants in Philadelphia; seven in New York City; five in South Florida; two in Atlantic City, New Jersey; two in Washington, D.C.; and one in Paris, France.
The Atlantic City Restaurants had closed as of 2020.

Philadelphia
The majority of Starr Restaurants, twenty, are located in Philadelphia. These restaurants include:
The Continental Restaurant and Martini Bar (American, 1995)
Buddakan (Modern Asian, 1998)
KPod (Contemporary Korean, 2021; formerly 'Pod', Contemporary Pan Asian, 2000)
Alma de Cuba (Modern Cuban, 2001. Partnership with Chef Douglas Rodriguez)
Morimoto (Contemporary Japanese, 2001. Partnership with Masaharu Morimoto)
Jones (American Comfort Food, 2002) Closed in January 2022
El Vez (Modern Mexican, 2003)
The Continental Midtown (Global Tapas, 2004) 
Barclay Prime (Luxury Boutique Steakhouse, 2004. Chef Jeff Froehler)
Parc (French, 2008. Chef Joe Monnich)
Butcher and Singer (Luxury Boutique Steak/Chophouse, 2008)
Pizzeria Stella (Pizza, 2009. Chef Shane Solomon)
El Rey (Mexican, 2010. Chef Dionicio Jimenez)
The Dandelion (British Pub, 2010. Chef Robert Aikens)
Serpico (Modern American, 2013. Partnership with Chef Peter Serpico)
Talula's Garden (Farm to Table, 2011. Chef Charles Parker)
Frankford Hall (Beer Garden, 2011. Chef James Davidson)
Fette Sau (Barbecue, 2012)
Talula's Daily (Farm to Table/Cafe, 2013)
The Love (American, 2017. Chef Aimee Olexy)

New York City
Buddakan (Modern Asian cuisine, 2006)
El Vez (Modern Mexican, 2014)
Upland (Modern American, 2014. Partnership with Chef Justin Smillie)
The Clocktower (New York Edition Hotel, 2015. Partnership with Chef Jason Atherton): Michelin Star , 2018 Michelin Guide.
Le Coucou (French, 2016. Partnership with Chef Daniel Rose): 2017 James Beard Foundation Award,  Best New Restaurant.
 Veronika, inside Fotografiska New York

South Florida
Steak 954 (W Hotel, Fort Lauderdale, Steakhouse, 2009)
Makoto (Bal Harbour, Sushi, 2011)
Le Zoo (Bal Harbour, French, 2015)
El Vez (W Hotel, Fort Lauderdale, Modern Mexican, 2018)

Washington D.C.
Le Diplomate (French, 2013. Chef Michael Abt)
St. Anselm (American, 2018. Chef Marjorie Meek-Bradley)

Paris
Chez La Vieille (French, 2016. Chef Daniel Rose)

Closed restaurants
Cafe Republic (Philadelphia, Russian, 1996–2016)
L'Ange Bleu (Blue Angel) (Philadelphia, French, 2003) 
Angelina (Philadelphia, Italian, 2005)
Washington Square (Philadelphia, International Street Food, 2007)
Striped Bass (Philadelphia, Seafood, June 2008)
Tangerine - (Philadelphia, Moroccan, 1999–2009)
Hybird (New York, Fried Chicken, Closed 2013) 
Route 6 (Philadelphia, Seafood, 2011–2014)
Il Pittore (Italian, 2011–2016)
Continental Miami (Miami Beach, Global Tapas, 2015–2017)
Square Burger (Burgers, 2009–2016) (new operator)

References

External links

Restaurants in Philadelphia
Regional restaurant chains in the United States